Veronika Kudermetova and Aleksandra Pospelova were the defending champions, but both players chose not to participate.

Han Xinyun and Makoto Ninomiya won the title after defeating Jacqueline Cako and Laura Robson 6–2, 7–6(7–3) in the final.

Seeds

Draw

References
Main Draw

Bank of Liuzhou Cup - Doubles